Huang Zhun may refer to:

Zhun Huang (composer), Chinese composer of film soundtracks
Huang Zhun (footballer), football player for Qingdao Jonoon F.C.